Violence against women in New Zealand is described as the kinds of violence faced by women disproportionately to men due to factors of ongoing gender inequality in society.  The New Zealand government and the New Zealand justice system view efforts to prevent and deal with violence against women as a priority of New Zealand legislation and the criminal justice system.  There are current domestic laws relating to the prevention and punishment of violence against women, however, despite these efforts, women in New Zealand still face high levels of violence. New Zealand was ranked as worst for Domestic Violence compared to other OECD countries with 1 in 3 women estimated to have been a victim of violence in their lifetime  and as of 2020, with the onset of the COVID-19 pandemic, NZ police were reported to be responding to a domestic violence call every 4 minutes. 

Women have been found to be more vulnerable to violence compared to men in New Zealand, as they were 2.5 times more likely to experience intimate partner violence (IPV) and 3 times more likely to experience sexual violence than men in 2018/19. 

Social and economic disadvantages experienced by Maori families have been linked to a lack of education, employability, health, income and overall wellbeing. Such difficult living circumstances may feed into violence as a learned behaviour by younger boys of the society, as boys learn and emulate behaviours they observe being displayed in their fathers. These contributing factors are currently being addressed in both law enforcement as well as government bodies, to address the issues in hopes of preventing violence against women.

Incidence of violence against women

Despite the existence of legislation and social campaigns targeting the reduction of various forms of violence against women, 1 in 3 women in New Zealand are estimated to have experienced physical and/or  sexual violence from a partner in their lifetime. Further, sexual assault is considered to be a less serious crime compared to other forms of interpersonal violence. According to the 2019 New Zealand Crime and Victims Survey (NZCVS), only 15% of victims believed sexual assault was a crime. 

Data on domestic violence against women in New Zealand is scarce. Data is largely dependent upon reporting and recording practices, and is unlikely to accurately represent the incidence of domestic violence against women in New Zealand.  In 2013, there were 6749 incidents of ‘male assaults female’ recorded by the New Zealand Police.  In 2013, 2013 Protection Orders were granted by Family Court in accordance with the provisions of the Domestic Violence Act 1995.  Ninety percent of respondents named in Protection Order applications were male.  In 2013, the National Collective of Independent Women's Refuges received 81,720 crisis calls and 2940 women (and children) accessed safe house services. The Dunedin Multidisciplinary Health and Development Study, a longitudinal cohort study of 1037 people born in Dunedin during 1972–73, found that by age 21, 27 percent of female study members reported they had been physically abused by a partner and 22 percent of male study members reported they had perpetrated violence against their partner. However, in contradiction to many other reports, the Dunedin study also found higher rates of domestic violence against men than against women, with 34 percent of male study members reporting physical abuse by a partner and 37 percent of female study members reporting they had perpetrated violence against their partner. More recently, the NZ Police crimes statistics database suggests that roughly 90% of all sexual assault victims over the age of 15 are female, with a total of 29,643 victims, for the period July 2014 to August 2019.

In the 2009 New Zealand Crime and Safety Survey (NZCASS), publishing survey data on crime that took place in 2008, sexual offences accounted for 5% of all offences reported in the survey. The New Zealand Police recorded crime for reported sexual offences in 2008 accounted for 1% of all offences. In the NZCASS, 45% of people who had experienced sexual offences considered the incident a crime, 31% considered the incident ‘wrong, but not a crime’, and 23% considered the incident as ‘just something that happens’.  Approximately one in four New Zealand women experience unwanted sexual contact in their lifetime, most often by someone known to them. Sexual offending costs the New Zealand economy approximately $1.2 billion NZD each year. In New Zealand in 2008 there were 607 prosecuted cases for rape, of which just 29% resulted in convictions, compared with the 68% conviction rate for all offences. A Ministry of Justice discussion paper exploring improvements to sexual violence legislation reported that around 90 percent of rapes go unreported. This makes it the least likely crime to be reported. Of Police files coded as sexual violation of an adult between 1 July 2005 and 31 December 2007, 95% of violations were of females. Of the perpetrators identified, 99% were male.

NZCASS 2014 
The NZCASS 2014 features "Improvements in methodologies, systems and statistical processes help make statistics more complete, accurate and useful. As part of the 2014 NZCASS, estimates for both 2006 and 2009 have been revised and recalculated and some previous estimates may have changed." Data from this study underwent a complex imputation process to ensure a small number of people did not have potentially large influences on the number of offences. As part of the imputation process a cut-off to the number of incidents experienced was applied to prevent a very small number of people
having a large and potentially inaccurate influence on the number of offences. To ensure data remained comparable across the years, The NZCASS methodology and application maintained as much consistency between the previous studies as possible.

Overall women and men experienced the same amount of violence with 10% of respondents reporting one or more incidents. However, the type of violence was different . Women were more likely to have experienced violence from an intimate partner (5.7% female vs 4.4% male) and men more likely to experience violence from a stranger (2.7% female vs 4.0% male).

In 2013 an estimated 23.1% of violent interpersonal  offences against females were reported to the police. 29.8% of all crime against women was reported to the police. Crimes may have been reported to the police by someone in the victims household, or the victim may have been aware that the police found out about it from another source. There is no statistically significant difference between females and males reporting crimes to the police, or any significant change over time from 2005.

35.4% of females consider their experience of a violent interpersonal offence a crime, 40.9%(with some statistical uncertainty) consider the event to be 'wrong, but not a crime' and 23.7% consider it to be 'just something that happens'.

The victims perception of the seriousness of the violent interpersonal offence was surveyed. 34.1% of females consider their experience to be 'low' seriousness, 22.4% moderate seriousness, and 43.5% 'high' seriousness. Similar to the results for males.

There has been a reduction in the reports of coercive control behaviours from their current partner between 2006 and 2013. Females where less likely to report coercive control (14.4% of females vs 17% of males). Most behaviors had similar rates but 9.2% of males reported their partner "gets angry if speaks to someone who is the same sex as their partner" compared to 4.8% of females.

Lifetime experience of partner violence and sexual violence 
Lifetime experience estimates are less reliable than asking about incidents in the previous 12 months because memory becomes more of an issue. Also, "the questionnaire does not explicitly ask this in reference to 'current' partner at the time of incident. Depending on the respondent's interpretation of the question, responses could include incidents by 'ex-partners'. Percentages include people who said 'yes', 'don't know / can't remember' and 'don’t' wish to answer'. The decision to include uninformative responses as if they had said they had experienced violence was based on literature findings that they are likely to be concealing a 'yes' response."

Overall there has been a reduction of lifetime reports of violence from partners. In 2006, 29.3% of females reported they had experienced one or more incidents of partner violence (assault, threats of force, threats to damage property, or damage – to property). This went down to 26.1% in 2013.

There was also a reduction in lifetime sexual violence (forced sexual intercourse, attempted forced sexual intercourse, distressing sexual touching, or 'other sexual violence'). In 2006, 28.3% of females reported a lifetime experience of sexual violence compared to 23.8% in 2014.

Both lifetime partner violence reports and lifetime sexual violence reports for females are significantly higher for females than males. For partner violence, in 2014, 13.8% of males reported, compared to 26.1% of females. For sexual violence, in 2013, 5.6% of males reported, compared to 23.8% females.

International Law

New Zealand's international treaty obligations require the state to submit periodic reports to the United Nations (UN) Human Rights Council (HRC) under the Universal Periodic Review and to the Committee on the Elimination of Discrimination against Women under the Convention on the Elimination of All Forms of Discrimination Against Women (CEDAW). Under these obligations, New Zealand is required to uphold its commitments to international human rights, including women's rights, and is subject to the scrutiny and recommendations made by the periodic reviews.

Universal Periodic Review

New Zealand's third Universal Periodic Review (UPR) was conducted in January/February 2019. This review is conducted by the UN Human Rights Council and aims to improve the human rights situation of each of the 193 United Nations (UN) members and occurs every five years.

The national report submitted by New Zealand in 2013 identified the reduction of violence within families and its disproportionate impact upon women and children as a key priority of the New Zealand Government. The report noted that research in New Zealand had found that "Victims of the more severe and lethal cases of family violence are predominantly women and children. Women with disabilities and Maori women are a particularly vulnerable group."

In the Report of the Working Group on the Universal Periodic Review for New Zealand, published in April 2014, New Zealand's acknowledgement of the high rate of family violence experienced by women was noted. The report further recognised the Government's commitment to eradicate the problem, including taking steps to reconvene the Family Violence Ministerial Group, the introduction of Police Safety Orders, expanding the definition of domestic violence to include economic and financial abuse, implementing the 2009 Action Plan for New Zealand Women, and implementation of recommendations on the Taskforce for Action on Sexual Violence. Included in the report were recommendations from seventeen other states suggesting measures for the reduction of violence against women in New Zealand. The New Zealand government accepted the majority of these recommendations and detailed the steps taken in carrying out the recommendations.

In 2013 the Office of the United Nations High Commissioner for Human Rights presented a compilation report on submissions to New Zealand's UPR. The concerns of the Committee on the Elimination of Discrimination against Women were emphasised.

Committee on the Elimination of Discrimination against Women
Under New Zealand's CEDAW obligations, New Zealand is required to submit periodic reports on the implementation of CEDAW to the Committee on the Elimination of Discrimination against Women (the Committee). New Zealand's most recent periodic report on its obligations under CEDAW was in 2010/2011. Since 1989, it has been common practice for parties to CEDAW to include in their periodic reports to the Committee information on any legislation protecting women against all kinds of violence, measures adopted to eradicate violence, existence of support systems for women who are the victims of violence, and statistical data on women who are the victims of violence. Furthermore, in 2010 the scope of Article 2 of CEDAW was described to include a due diligence obligation on states to prevent discrimination by private actors.

New Zealand government's report to the Committee
In the New Zealand government's report to the Committee in January 2011 it was considered that the reduction of "the damaging impact of violence against women, in particular sexual violence" was a priority of the New Zealand government, and that "violence against women remains cause for immense concern". The report made the observations that although the recorded rates of family violence in New Zealand were rising, New Zealand had launched social campaigns such as the 'It's not OK' campaign, completed ongoing work through the Taskforce for Action on Violence within Families, and set up the Taskforce for Action on Sexual Violence. The report concluded that, "Government is committed to reducing violence against women," and that, "there is no acceptable level of family violence and that the notion that family violence is normal or acceptable must be dispelled."

Concluding observations of the Committee
In its concluding observations, issued in August 2012, the Committee noted its concern about the continued high levels of violence against women and low rates of reporting and conviction, particularly in instances of sexual violence, despite progress made. It expressed further concern at "insufficient" statistical data on violence against women, particularly against Maori women, migrant women, and women with disabilities. The Committee called upon New Zealand to take steps to encourage reporting of violence against women, to strengthen training for relevant authorities in dealing with violence against women, to provide assistance and protection services for women victims of violence, and to ensure systematic collection and publication of disaggregated data, and "monitor effectiveness of legislation, policy and practice to all forms of violence against women and girls."

Follow-up to the concluding observations
New Zealand provided information in the follow-up to the concluding observations elucidating changes being made to better use and collect data regarding violence against women, including steps to ensure the collection and analysis of disaggregated data. The government response to the Committee's concluding observations also discussed changes to the Domestic Violence Act 1995 and the taking of a "long-term approach" to ending family violence through promoting changes in attitude and behaviours.

Domestic law

Domestic violence

The Domestic Violence Act 1995 was enacted to ensure the legal protection for victims of any physical, sexual, and psychological domestic violence. The Domestic Violence Act 1995 provides, through the Family Court, a civil procedure for obtaining a 'protection order' requiring perpetrators of domestic violence to desist, and attend "stopping violence" programmes for the prevention of family violence. The New Zealand Police can also issue immediately effective 'Police Safety Orders' requiring  the person issued with the order to leave the address of the victim for up to five days. Criminal courts may also issue protection orders during sentencing for a domestic violence offence.

Sexual offences

Sexual offences are defined in the Crimes Act 1961. The crime of  requires that the accused did not have the person's consent and did not believe on reasonable grounds that the person was consenting.  A 2008 discussion document issued by the Ministry of Justice called for submissions on the inclusion of ‘positive consent’, the inclusion of broader investigation into the surrounding circumstances in determining whether the accused had reasonable grounds for consent, and the extension of the ‘rape shield’ to limit a defendant's ability to question a complainant about their past sexual behaviour. Furthermore, the question was raised over the models and practices of the current justice system in dealing with sexual violence. In 2009 the Taskforce for Action on Sexual Violence produced a report including recommendations on preventing sexual violence, creating specialist front-line services for victims and offenders, reforming criminal justice, and approaches to end sexual violence.  The report recommended the completion of a Sexual Violence Prevention Plan, a review of funding for crisis support services, legislative changes to the Accident Compensation Corporation scheme, legislative amendments to the Crimes Act 1961, and an exploration of alternative justice in cases of sexual offences. The New Zealand government responded to the report in September 2010, however it was noted by the Committee on the Elimination of Discrimination against Women in 2012 that many of the recommendations in the report have yet to be implemented.

Further information and resources

The Campaign for Action on Family Violence (the 'It's Not OK' campaign) uses advertising, social media and community-projects to develop information, understanding, and advice surrounding family violence prevention. According to research, one in three people report taking some form of action to prevent family violence as a result of the Campaign. The Campaign focuses upon changing attitudes and behaviour towards violence within families through leadership, safety and accountability, and effective support services.

The Ministry for Women is a government department that advises the government on women's economic independence, leadership, and safety from violence. The Ministry for Women in New Zealand provides research publications on issues effecting women, including violence against women generally and its effect on particular groups of women. New Zealand's international obligations in relation to the status of women are primarily managed by the Ministry of Women, and their role includes the promotion of consistency between international and domestic law protecting the interests and well-being of women.

In New Zealand, the Women's Refuge is a community support service that provides crisis line support, information, planning services, and education and training programmes on the prevention of violence against women in New Zealand. Women's Refuge works to promote social discussion on domestic violence and to inform public debate.

The New Zealand Family Violence Clearinghouse provides an online catalogue and depository for resources, statistics, and publications on family violence in New Zealand.

The Ministry of Justice in New Zealand, provides statistics surrounding violence in New Zealand. It acknowledges that men in New Zealand also experience violence, but women experience a disproportionate level in comparison to men, 87% of violence reports coming from women in comparison to 13% from men in  2019.

Violence against Māori women in New Zealand
In February 2015 the New Zealand Ministry for Women released a report stating that Māori women are twice as likely as other New Zealand women to experience some form of violence.

Victims and perpetrators

Whilst family violence occurs in all socio-economic groupings in New Zealand, Maori are over represented as both the victims and perpetrators.

The predominant concern for entities such as the-then New Zealand Families Commission is intimate partner violence (IPV), with Māori women being at a three times higher risk of IPV than other women.

Another chief concern of government agencies such as the Ministry of Social Development is child abuse.
Just over half of Child, Youth and Family clients whom have at least one substantiated abuse finding are Māori. Of this total number, a little over half are girls meaning that Māori girls are at a higher risk than any other children in New Zealand of experiencing abuse.

Other forms of whānau violence are not as largely represented in statistics, however they still make up for a moderate percentage of violence against Māori women. Between 2011 and 2012 Māori women were the most common gender and ethnic group to be admitted to hospital following assault with the perpetrator being identified as a family member. More than two thirds of the total number of assault hospitalisations were women and half of the total were Māori. Of these cases, about 19% of the perpetrators were identified as ‘other' family members, with spouse/domestic partners being the outstanding perpetrators.

Contributing factors

The major contributing factors for family violence in New Zealand is social and economic disadvantage regarding education, employment, health, housing and income. 
Hardship experienced by Māori is seen as a key factor which, when combined with other factors, significantly increases the risk of whānau violence.

Unemployment rates for young Māori women who are under 25 years of age are twice that of European women, with more than one in four Māori youth in the labour market being unemployed.
For those who are employed, the median income is significantly lower than that of other ethnicities such as New Zealand European; with the median income for Māori over the age of 15 being $22,500.

Beneficiaries and those in sole parent households are also at a much higher risk to fall victim to family violence than other women. Currently, Māori make up for almost a third of the total proportion of beneficiaries in New Zealand. Further hardship in regards to housing is illustrated by Statistics New Zealand findings from 2006, estimating that almost a quarter of Māori live in crowded households.

The highest rates of IPV have been found to occur within young families, signalling that age is another contributing factor to violence. Statistics New Zealand show that the Māori population is largely young. This factor combined with social and economic hardship may be the reason for over representation of Māori in family violence statistics in New Zealand.

In a study of a group of Māori women who have experienced whānau violence, the women identified financial dependence on other family members, in particular partners/spouses, as a key contributing factor for violence. They identified the link beginning at education through to employment opportunities and adequate income with freedom of choice, independence, safety and equal power and control.

Influence of drugs and alcohol
Stemming from social and economic factors contributing to violence against Māori women is the use of drugs and alcohol by Māori. Drug and alcohol use is influenced by easy accessibility in low-income neighbourhoods due to a high number of alcohol outlets, community norms of heavy binge drinking and use of illegal drugs and use as a coping mechanism for poverty, poor health and racism.

Whilst rates of alcohol-related assault vary widely in different populations of women, five percent of all women in New Zealand have reported physical assault due to someone else's drinking. This rate is significantly higher for young women, women living in deprived areas, and Māori women.

In a 2009 survey by the Ministry of Health, Māori women were found to be almost four times more likely than non-Māori women to have been assaulted in the past year by someone under the influence of drugs or alcohol. Furthermore, significantly more Māori victims of violent incidents committed by a partner or other well-known person said the offender was affected by drugs (45%) or alcohol (59%), as opposed to European victims (22% and 35% respectively).

Learned behaviour theory

The Mauri Ora framework was created by the Second Māori Taskforce on whānau violence to further the current understanding of whānau violence. 
The framework acknowledged that whānau violence is a learned and practiced behaviour that has become normalised and entrenched through several generations.

This concern, that violence and abuse is a learned behaviour, is supported by findings that children who are raised within violent family environments do not understand the negative consequences of the use of violence and are more likely to adopt violent behaviour within their own families as they mature. Children who witness violence between their parents are also at a much greater risk of later adjustment difficulties such as antisocial behaviours.

For this reason, the Second Māori Taskforce on whānau violence labelled whanau violence as an epidemic, acknowledging that the objective of zero tolerance of whānau violence would take time to become unlearned.

Use of community organisations by Māori women and children

There are Maori organisations developed to aid women in situations of domestic and family violence. For instance, the New Zealand Women's Refuge seeks to help women stuck in these situations and provide support and help to exit out of these dangerous family environments. A report has been released outlining the current preventative measures that will be used by the government, with the report also including information for women who are fleeing violence on what to after escaping such a situation and where to find help.The Ministry of Health has suggested that Māori women and children often use health and community services later than others, meaning that when they do their injuries and issues are more serious.

Community organisations such as the New Zealand Women's Refuge have attempted to make their services more accessible to Māori women and children experiencing whānau violence by providing culturally appropriate services. Of the 45 local refuges around New Zealand,  14 ‘whares’ (houses) have been specifically designed by Māori for wahine (Māori women) and their tamariki (children) and whānau. The whares’ aim to eliminate violence whilst promoting Māori values such as the wellbeing of whānau, promoting mana (strength), transformation and creating support within the wider community.

Figures from 2011 and 2012 support the introduction of these specialised refuges for Māori women as half of the total number of women who used Women's Refuge services were identified as Māori.

Current prevention techniques
The Ministry for Women acknowledge that when dealing with violence there are three stages of prevention, namely, primary (before violence occurs, with a focus on large groups) and secondary and tertiary (after violence occurs, with a targeted focus on victims and offenders). The Ministry has noted that previously most primary prevention approaches for violence against women specifically targeted women but has recently begun to include men and boys. The aim of this is to educate men and boys, as partners, to promote respectful, non-violent relationships in which each partner feels safe and supported. 
The shift towards engaging boys and men in the prevention of violence against women recognizes that men are the primary perpetrators of violence against women. It also encourages male socialisation and encourages non-violent men to serve as positive role models and to act as active bystanders to prevent and intervene in situations involving violence towards women.

The New Zealand Department of Corrections has recognised that whānau violence perpetrators have a range of individual problems such as anger, hostility and personality disorders from having witnessed or suffered abuse as children.  
Current prevention techniques include providing education, information and support services to implement changes in attitude and behaviour for not only the victims and perpetrators of whānau violence but also for the whānau and wider community. The focus on the wider community is of particular importance as it focuses on the large scale of whānau violence and aims to shift attitudes and norms within the Māori culture.

Another culturally sensitive prevention technique is the Mauri Ora framework which incorporates Maori principles and values such as whakapapa (genealogy), tikanga (general behaviour guidelines for daily life and interaction within the Māori culture), wairua (spirit), tapu (forbidden/sacred values), mauri (the essence of emotions), and mana (power). These cultural constructs help to give priority to Māori culture, knowledge and identity when addressing the issue of whānau violence. They also help non-Māori to understand the different approach required on the path to eliminating whānau violence. The framework aims to apply the principles in practice when facing contemporary issues of today such as colonisation. This is a fairly new approach focussing on the preservation of Māori values within the environmental and contextual influences of modern New Zealand.

See also
 Human rights in New Zealand
 Women's rights
 Violence against women
 Domestic violence
 Sexual violence
 Convention on the Elimination of All Forms of Discrimination Against Women
 Women in New Zealand
 Sexual Abuse Prevention Network

References

External links
 Ministry for Women
 Office of Ethnic Affairs
 New Zealand Family Violence Clearinghouse
 National Council of Women of New Zealand
 Women's Refuge
 Family Violence: It's Not OK

New Zealand
Violence in New Zealand
Human rights abuses in New Zealand